Two Cities may refer to:

 Two Cities Films, a British film production company
 Two Cities (novel), a 1998 American novel by John Edgar Wideman
 Two Cities (musical), a 2006 stage musical
 Two Cities, the episcopal area of the Anglican Bishop of London